Sarah Jane Ibañez Elago (born October 18, 1989) is a Filipino activist and politician. She was a member of the Philippine House of Representatives for its 17th and 18th Congress, both times representing the youth sector under Kabataan Party-list. Before entering Congress, she was also the national president of the National Union of Students in the Philippines. , she was the youngest female lawmaker in the Philippines.

Early life and education
Elago was born on October 18, 1989, in Manila. As a child, she stuttered and found it difficult to speak to others. She learned to manage the disability by joining drama clubs, singing, and reading out loud.

She would eventually study at the University of the Philippines Diliman, graduating cum laude with a degree in Bachelor of Science in Hotel, Restaurant, and Institution Management.

During her college days, she was a member of The UP Repertory Company (UP Rep), UP Kontemporaryong Gamelan Pilipino, a theater arts performing group, and a student councilor for two years. Elago was also involved in youth sectoral politics and activism, becoming a coordinator for Youth Vote Philippines and Rock the Vote Philippines, an officer in the International Youth Council, and a member of the Asia Pacific Conference on Reproductive and Sexual Health and Rights - National Youth Committee in 2013. She was also the national president of the National Union of Students of the Philippines, and a national convenor for the Rise for Education Alliance and Youth for Accountability and Truth Now.

Political career

House of Representatives
In 2016, Elago became a party-list representative for Kabataan Partylist, representing the youth sector. She was 25. As Kabataan representative, Elago was a member of the Makabayan Coalition with seven others: Carlos Isagani Zarate of Bayan Muna, Antonio Tinio and France Castro of ACT Teachers, Ariel Casilao of Anakpawis, and Emmi de Jesus and Arlene Brosas of Gabriela Women's Party.

She was reelected in 2019 for the 18th Congress, once again representing Kabataan Party-list. Joining her in the Makabayan Bloc were fellow incumbents Zarate, Castro, and Brosas, along with Ferdinand Gaite and Eufemia Cullamat from Bayan Muna, for a total of six seats. She is a former member of the minority for 12 House committees, including Youth and Sports Development, Women and Gender Equality, and Higher and Technical Education. Elago has currently authored 257 house measures and co-authored 8.

She has already authored 426 bills during her stint in the 18th Congress.

Besides being the youngest lawmaker, she is also the poorest lawmaker with a net worth of ₱85,400 based on her 2018 Statement of Assets, Liabilities, and Net Worth (SALN). She was also the poorest in 2017 with a net worth of ₱75,800.

Elago supported the franchise renewal for broadcast network ABS-CBN. She was also among the representatives that opposed House Bill No. 78 allowing for 100 percent foreign ownership in power, transport, and communications sectors in the Philippines.

Advocacies
Running for Kabataan Partylist, she does not only advocate for the advancement of youth agenda but also free education, free internet for all, and gender equality. She has also shown support to breast cancer warriors and survivors by donating her hair.

Elago is also the founding president of the Philippine Stuttering Association, an advocacy group that supports people who stutter.

During the May 2019 School Strike for Climate, Elago joined youth protesters calling for a rejection of government proposals that could have detrimental effects on the environment.

References

External links 

Living people
University of the Philippines Diliman alumni
Party-list members of the House of Representatives of the Philippines
Women members of the House of Representatives of the Philippines
21st-century Filipino politicians
Anti-revisionists
Youth activists
Anti-fascists
21st-century Filipino women politicians
People from Manila
Politicians from Manila
1989 births